The Pakistan Navy (PN) (romanized: Pākistān Bāhrí'a) is the naval branch of the Pakistan Armed Forces. The President of Pakistan is the Supreme Commander of the Navy. The Chief of Naval Staff, a four-star admiral commands the navy. The Pakistan Navy operates on the coastline of Pakistan in the Arabian Sea and Gulf of Oman. It was established in August 1947, following the independence of Pakistan from the United Kingdom.

Its primary objective is to ensure the defence of the sea lines of communication of Pakistan and to safeguard Pakistan's maritime interests by executing national policies through the exercise of military effect, diplomatic and humanitarian activities in support of these objectives. In addition to its war services, the Navy has mobilized its war assets to conduct humanitarian rescue operations at home as well as participating in multinational task forces mandated by the United Nations to prevent seaborne terrorism and privacy off the coasts.

The Pakistan Navy is a volunteer force which has been in conflict with neighbouring India twice on its sea borders, and has been repeatedly deployed in the Indian Ocean to act as a military advisor to Gulf Arab states and other friendly nations during the events of multinational conflict as part of its commitment to the United Nations. The Navy has several components including the Naval Aviation, Marines, and the Maritime Security Agency (a coast guard). Since its commencement on 14 August 1947, the defensive role of the Navy has expanded from securing the sealines and becoming the custodian of Pakistan's second strike capability with an ability to launch underwater missile system to target enemy positions.

The Navy is commanded by the Chief of Naval Staff, a four-star admiral, who is a member of the Joint Chiefs of Staff Committee. The Chief of Naval Staff is nominated by the Prime Minister and appointed by the President of Pakistan. The current Chief is Admiral Amjad Khan Niazi who was appointed on 7 October 2020. Admiral Niazi is the 22nd Chief of the Pakistan Navy, taking charge after Zafar Mahmood Abbasi.

History

Division of Royal Indian Navy in 1947

The Pakistan Navy came into existence on 14 August 1947 with the establishment of Pakistan as an independent state from the United Kingdom. The Armed Forces Reconstitution Committee (AFRC) under British Field Marshal Sir Claude Auchinleck divided the shares and assets of the Royal Indian Navy (RIN) between the India and Pakistan in a ratio of 2:1, with Pakistan receiving the two sloops, two frigates, four minesweepers, two naval trawlers and four harbour launches. The Armed Forces Reconstitution Committee (AFRC) allocated about the two-thirds of the assets of the Royal Indian Navy to the India while one third was given to Pakistan despite Pakistan having inherited the high percentage of delta areas on its coast and the large maritime area covering the Arabian sea on West and the Bay of Bengal on East. In addition, India also objected to transfer any machinery at the Bombay Dockyard to Pakistan and further refused to part the machinery that happened to be on its soil.

The Navy endured a difficult history— with only 200 officers and 3,000 sailors were inherited to the Navy– the most senior being Captain HMS Choudri who had little experience in the military staffing. Of the ~200 officers, twenty of these had come from the Executive Branch of the Royal Indian Navy, and only six officers were the mechanical engineers while there were none electrical engineers or specialists to care for the electrical systems needed to be look after in the weapons systems or the powering up the machinery in the vessels as whole. The Navy suffered perennial problems with inadequate staff, lack of operational bases, lack of financial support, and poor technological and personnel resources. Secondly, it grew out as the smallest military uniform branch that contributed in its lack of importance in federal budgets as well as the problems relating to its institutional infrastructure.

The Army and the Air Force were the dominant forces where the defence planning were based wholly on army and air force point of view. Additional problems relating to the Navy were the lack of facilities and maintenance machinery, as the only naval dockyard on the subcontinent was located in Bombay in India.

To overcome these difficulties, the Navy had to launch a recruitment program for the young nation, starting in the East-Pakistan which proved to be very difficult to sustain the program; therefore, it was moved back to West-Pakistan to concentrate recruitment on West Pakistan. Furthermore, the Navy's procurement was greatly determined by its war role and it had to struggle for a role for itself throughout its history from its beginning.

The beginning: 1947–1964

Reorganization under the United States Navy (1947–1964)

The Navy's combat actions largely remained in absence during the first war with India in 1947–48 as all the fighting was restricted to land and aerial combat missions. On operational planning, Captain HMS Choudri had engaged on commanding a former RIN destroyer from Karachi to Bombay to oversee the evacuation of Indian emigrants to Pakistan. In 1948, the Royal Pakistan Navy had to engage in humanitarian missions to evacuate Indian immigrants trapped in disputed and hostile areas, with its frigates operating continuously.

Command and control of the new Navy was extremely difficult as Prime Minister Liaquat Ali Khan's administration had to extend the employment of large number of the Royal Navy officers from the British Admiralty with Rear admiral James Wilfred Jefford appointed as the Flag Officer Commanding (FOC) who worked on creating the contingency plan, "Short-term Emergency Plan (STEP)", to work up the frigates and naval defences in case of escalation of the war at sea. In 1948, the Directorate-General for the Naval Intelligence (DGNI), a staff corps, was established under Lieutenant S. M. Ahsan, who served as its first Director-General, in Karachi. When the first war came to an end in 1948, the Navy temporarily established its Navy NHQ in Karachi and acquired its first O-class destroyer from the transfer by the Royal Navy.

Tippu Sultan was commissioned on 30 September 1949, under Commander P.S. Evans, whilst Tariq was placed under the command of Lieutenant-Commander A. R. Khan. The two destroyers formed the 25th Destroyer Squadron, as PNS Jhelum and PNS Tughril, under Commander Muzaffar Hasan, also joined the Royal Pakistan Navy.

In 1950, the Navy's nationalisation took place when many officers from the air force and army volunteered to join the navy and NCOs gaining commission as an officers. Support from the army and air force to the navy led to the establishment of logistics and maintenance machinery with vigorous efforts directed towards integrating the navy presence in East Pakistan, thereby creating opportunities for people in East Pakistan to participate in the build-up.

In 1951, the Pakistan government called for appointing native chiefs of the armed forces, but it was not until 1953 that a native navy chief was appointed. The British Admiralty, however, maintained the command of the Navy through Rear-Admiral Jefford who had native deputy chiefs of staff including Commodore HMS Choudhri, Commodore Khalid Jamil, and Commander M.A. Alavi.

During this time, a number of goodwill missions were carried out by the navy's warships, and non-combat missions were conducted under the auspices of the Royal Navy. In 1951, HMS Choudhri's promotion papers as naval chief were approved by Prime Minister Liaquat Ali Khan but it was not until 1953 when HMS Choudhri was promoted as vice admiral and commander with the support from army commander-in-chief General Ayub Khan. He handed over the command of 25th Destroyer squadron to a Polish naval officer, Commander Romuald Nalecz-Tyminski.

In the mid-1950s, the Ministry of Finance awarded contracts to the Corps of Engineers (Pakistan Army) for the construction of the Karachi Naval Dockyard. From 1953 to 1956, HMS Choudri bitterly negotiated with the United States over the modernisation of the navy and convinced the U.S. government to provide monetary support for modernisation of ageing O–class destroyers and minesweepers, while commissioning the Ch–class destroyers from the Royal Navy. British naval tradition was disbanded and cancelled when the United States Navy's advisers were dispatched to the Pakistani military in 1955.

With the promulgation of the Constitution of Pakistan that established the republicanism featuring the federalised government, the prefix Royal was dropped, and the service was re-designated the Pakistan Navy ("PN") with the Jack replaced the Queen's colour and the White Ensign respectively in 1956. The order of precedence of the three services changed from Navy–Army–Air force to Army–Navy–Air Force.

In February 1956, the British government announced the transfer of several major surface combat warships to Pakistan Navy, including a cruiser and four destroyers to be purchased with funds made available under the U.S. Military Assistance Program. In 1957, the Navy finalised the purchase of a cruiser from the United Kingdom and used the government's own funds for the purchase which caused a great ire against Admiral Choudhri in the Finance Ministry.

In 1958, the Navy made an unsuccessful attempt to obtain s from Sweden using the American security funds; it was halted by the United States and Pakistan's Finance Ministry despite the fact that the idea had support from Army GHQ. In 1958–59, the Navy NHQ staff began quarrelling with the Army GHQ staff and the Ministry of Defense (MoD) over plans regarding the modernisation of the navy that resulted in bitter interservice rivalry between army and navy and ended with Admiral Choudri's resignation to the Presidency in 1959.

Proposal of attaining the aircraft carrier was deferred due to financial constraints, forcing Pakistan to move towards establishing the formidable submarine command. From 1956 to 1963, two destroyers, eight coastal minesweepers, and an oiler were procured from the United States and United Kingdom as a direct result of Pakistan's participation in the anti-Communist defence pacts SEATO and CENTO.

War with India and subsequent war deployments (1965–1970)

After the bitter resignation of Vice-Admiral HMS Choudri in 1959, Vice-Admiral Afzal Rahman Khan was appointed as the Commander in Chief in Navy who worked towards building relations with President Ayub Khan in retaining hopes for procuring a submarine despite financial constraints. The Royal Navy accepted the long awaiting requests from the Pakistan Navy for a regular visit to Karachi Naval Dockyard to provide first hand experience in submarine operations in 1960–61. The Ayub administration did not increase the financial funding of the navy at the expense to army and air force but he did not object to American contributions to train the Pakistan Navy in submarine operations. It was the U.S. Navy that provided an insightful and crucial training support to Pakistan Navy enabling it to conduct operations in long range in the Indian Ocean and the proposal of procuring the submarine was met with favourable views in 1963 due to the prospect of the Soviet Navy leasing a submarine to the Indian Navy. After seeing the U.S. contribution, the United Kingdom decided to provide training and education to Pakistan Navy on submarine operations, and in 1964,  was commissioned from the United States under the Security Assistance Program (SAP).

Even though, neither the Navy nor the Air Force was notified of the Kashmir incursion in 1965, the Navy was well-prepared at the time when the second war broke out between Pakistan and India in 1965. The naval chief Admiral Afzal Rahman Khan ordered all war units of the Pakistan Navy to take up defensive positions off the coast, but did not order any offensive operations in the Bay of Bengal. As the Indian Air Force's repeated sorties and raids disrupted PAF operations, the Navy assumed a more aggressive role in the conflict. On 2 September, the Navy deployed its first long-range submarine, PNS Ghazi under Commander K. R. Niazi which was charged with gathering intelligence on Indian naval movements that stalked the diverting threats posed by the aircraft carrier .

On the night of 7/8 September, a naval squadron comprising four destroyers, one frigate, one cruiser, and one submarine, under the command of Commodore S. M. Anwar, launched artillery operation— an attack on the radar facilities used by the Indian Air Force in the small coastal town of Dwarka. The operation ended with limited damage to the area. After gunnery bombardment,  was deployed against the Indian Navy's Western Naval Command at Bombay on 22 September and ended her operations and reported safely back to Karachi Naval Dockyard on 23 September 1965.

The Pakistan Navy explored the idea of installing Russian missile system on former British frigates but Soviets refrained from doing so due to objections from India.

After the war, the United States imposed an arms embargo on Pakistan and Pakistani military began exploring options for military procurement from China, France, and Soviet Union. The United Kingdom offered the Navy to jointly built the Type 21 frigate but was rejected by Ayub administration that would only allow the financial capital to be spent on submarine procurement.

In 1966, the Pakistan Navy established its own special operations force, the Navy Special Service Group (Navy SSG) after the recommendations from the United States Navy. In 1966–70, Pakistan Navy had been well aware of massive procurement and acquisitions of weapon systems being acquired from the Soviet Union and United Kingdom, and the danger it will posed to Pakistan. In 1966–69, there were series of unsuccessful talks of acquiring the warships from the Soviet Navy which ended with no yielding results. The Soviet Union offered to sell their  but Pakistan Navy wanted the Styx missiles to be installed in frigates in a believe that the missile boats were not big enough to meet the Pakistani requirements in operating in the Indian Ocean. The Russians later determined to their strategic interests lay with India and allowed the developing relationship with Pakistan to wither.

Difficulties arose between and after the arms embargo was lifted by the United States which lifted based strictly on cash-and-carry basis. Pleas for strengthening the Navy in East Pakistan were ignored due to monetary issues and financial constraints restricted the Navy's capabilities to function more efficiently. In 1968, the s were procured from France while operating s that was refitted and upgraded by the Turkish Navy. Due to the Egyptian blockade of the Suez Canal, the Navy had to execute a notable submerged circumnavigation operation from the Indian Ocean through the Atlantic Ocean in order to undergo a refit program at the Gölcük Naval Shipyard in Turkey which was the only facility to manage the refitting and mid-life upgrades of military computers of the Tench class.  Despite reservations harbouring by the Navy NHQ about the ageing Ghazi, she was sailed under the command of Commander Ahmed Tasnim starting from the Karachi coast in Indian Ocean to Cape of Good Hope, South Africa, through the Atlantic Ocean and ended at the east coast of the Sea of Marmara where the Gölcük Naval Shipyard was located.

In 1968–69, the Navy NHQ staff began its tussle with the Air AHQ staff over the issue establishing the naval aviation who feared the loss of fighter jets and their pilots in the sea and was hostile towards this idea. The United States entered in discussing the transfer of P3B Orion aircraft to the Navy in 1970 with Yahya administration but were not procured until the end of the 1970s. In 1970, the foreign relations between Pakistan and East Pakistan further deteriorated and the Navy knew that it was impossible to defend East Pakistan from approaching Indian Navy. Series of reforms were carried when Navy's serious reservations were considered by the Yahya administration and East Pakistanis were hastily recruited in what was known as Eastern Naval Command (Pakistan) but this proved to be disaster for Navy when majority of Bengali naval officers and ~3,000 sailors defected to India to join the Awami League's military wing– the Mukti Bahini. Such events had jeopardised the operational scope of the Navy and the Navy NHQ staffers and commanders knew very well that it (Navy) was ill-prepared for the war and Pakistan was about to learn the consequences of disconnecting strategy from reality.

Indo-Pakistan war of 1971

By 1971, the Navy NHQ staffers and their commanders knew very well that the Pakistan Navy was poorly represented in East Pakistan (now Bangladesh) and there was no main infrastructure to conduct defensive operation against the Eastern Naval Command of Indian Navy in Bay of Bengal. The Navy was only able conducted the riverine-based operations that was being undertaken by the Pakistan Marines with the assistance from the Navy Special Service Group, code named, Barisal, in April 1971. Although, the Governor of East Pakistan, Vice-Admiral S.M. Ahsan, made efforts to increase the naval presence and significance in 1969 but the Indian Navy's Eastern Naval Command continued to pose a significant threat since it had capability of conduct operations in long-range areas.

Furthermore, the defections from Navy's Bengali officers and sailors had jeopardise the Navy's operational scope who went onto join the Awami League's militant wing, the Mukti Bahini in a program known as Jackpot. Though, the program was disrupted by the Navy from further annihilation but the naval facilities were severely damaged due to this operation on 15 March 1971. East-Pakistan's geography was surrounded by India on all three landward sides by the Indian Army as the Navy was in attempt to prevent India from blocking the coasts.

During this time, the Navy NHQ was housed in Karachi that decided to deploy the newly MLU Ghazi submarine on East while  in West for the intelligence gathering purposes.

With no naval aviation branch to guard the Karachi port, the Indian Navy breached the seaborne borders of Pakistan and successfully launched the first missile attack, consisting of three Soviet-built s escorted by two anti-submarine patrol vessels on 4 December 1971. Nearing Karachi's port area, the Indian Navy's squadron launched Styx missiles anti-ship missiles, which the obsolescent Pakistani warships had no viable defence against. After the attacks, the Indian Navy's missile boat squadron safely returned to its home base without sustaining any damages.

The Pakistan Air Force now covering for Karachi made several of the unsuccessful attempts to engage the Indian Navy's missile boat squadron by carrying out the aerial bombing missions over the Okha Harbor– the forward base of the Indian Navy's missile boat squadron. The Indian Navy retaliated with a second missile attack on Pakistan's coast on the night of 8 December 1971 when a small flotilla of Indian vessels, consisting of a missile boat and two frigates, approached Karachi and launched a missile attack that sank the Panamanian cargo ship Gulf Star, PNS Dacca and the British merchant ship SS Harmattan were damaged.

The missile-based attacks were the complete success for the Indian Navy, and a psychological trauma for Pakistan Navy, the human and material cost severely cutting into its combat capability, nearly 1,700 sailors perished at the barracks.

The commercial pilots from the Pakistan International Airlines volunteered to conduct air surveillance missions with the Pakistan Air Force, but this proved less than helpful when the Pakistan Navy's forward observer team, led by Cdre. A. W. Bhombal misidentified their own larger frigate, as an Indian missile boat, giving clearance to the F-86 fighter jets of the Pakistan Air Force which made several attack runs before finally identifying Zulfiqar by the Navy NHQ. This serious friendly fire incident resulted in further loss of navy personnel, as well as the loss of the ship, which was severely damaged and the Pakistan Navy's operational capabilities were now virtually extinct, and morale plummeted. The Indian Navy observers who watched the raid nearby later wrote in their war logs that the "PAF pilots failed to recognize the difference between a large PNS Zulfiqar frigate and a relatively small Osa missile boat." The PAF, however, contested this claim by holding Cdre. Bhombal of the responsibility of misidentifying his own warship and giving clearance to the PAF to mount an attack on their own ship.

The Navy's only long range submarine, Ghazi, was deployed to the area but, according to neutral sources, it sank en route under mysterious circumstances. Pakistani authorities state that it sank either due to internal explosion or detonation of mines which it was laying at the time. The Indian Navy claims to have sunk the submarine.

The submarine's destruction enabled the Indian Navy to enforce a blockade on then East Pakistan. According to the defence magazine, Pakistan Defence Journal, the attack on Karachi, Dhaka, Chittagong and the loss of Ghazi, the Navy no longer was able to match the threat of Indian Navy as it was already outclassed by the Indian Navy after the 1965 war.

The damage inflicted by the Indian Navy and Indian Air Force on the Navy stood at seven gunboats, one minesweeper, two destroyers, three patrol craft, eighteen cargo, supply and communication vessels, and large-scale damage inflicted on the naval base and docks in the coastal town of Karachi. Three merchant navy ships; Anwar Baksh, Pasni and Madhumathi; and ten smaller vessels were captured. Around 1,900 personnel were lost, while 1413 servicemen (mostly officers) were captured by Indian forces in Dhaka. The Indian Navy lost 18 officers and 176 sailors and a frigate, while another frigate was damaged and a Breguet Alizé naval aircraft was shot down by the Pakistan Air Force.

According to one Pakistan scholar, Tariq Ali, the Pakistan Navy lost half its force in the war. Despite the limited resources and manpower, the Navy performed its task diligently by providing support to inter-services (air force and army) until the end.

According to the testimony provided by the Admiral Mohammad Shariff in 2015, the primary reason for this loss has been attributed to the High Command's failure in defining a role for the Navy, or even considering Navy as military in general. Since then the Navy has sought to improve the structure and fleet by putting special emphasis on sub-surface warfare capability as it allows for the most efficient way to deny the control of Pakistani sea lanes to an adversary. In a thesis written by Dr. P. I. Cheema in 2002, Ayub Khan, who had enjoyed considerable influence on Pakistan's national politicians, did not fully understood the Navy as a military service or neither comprehend the importance of safeguarding the sea lines of communication, which prevented the development of the Navy as a potent force as it should have in the 1970s.

Restructuring and building towards modern Navy: 1972–1989

After 1971 war, steps were taken to modernise and increase the operational scope of the Navy. Unlike the army or the air force, the naval officers were able to continue their military service with the Navy, and their promotions were relatively quicker than other military branches in 1972–74.

In January 1972, the Bhutto administration formed the POW Commission to investigate the number of war prisoners held by the Indian Army in East and submitted the request to the Supreme Court of Pakistan to investigate the causes of the war failure with India in 1971. After concluding a quick visit in the United States in 1972, President Bhutto used his administrative powers to dishonorably discharge the commission of five senior admirals in the Navy, appointing the junior most H. H. Ahmed as the first Chief of Naval Staff of the Navy. In 1973, the Navy NHQ was permanently moved to Islamabad to provide synergy with the Army GHQ in Rawalpindi.

In 1974, the Naval Aviation branch was established with the transfer of the Westland Sea King helicopters from the United Kingdom in 1975, followed by test firing the surface-to-ship Exocet missile as a befitting response to the Indian Navy in 1979. With the ability to fire the land-based Exocet missile from a reconnaissance aircraft, the Navy became the first of its kind in the South Asia to acquire land-based ballistics missile capable long range reconnaissance aircraft.

In 1976, the Navy moved towards successfully acquiring the military computers from the British firm, the Ferranti, to increase its defences for its coastlines. The War Enquiry Commission noted the lack of strategic communication and the grand strategy between the four-branches of the military during the conflict and wars with India, recommending the establishment of the Joint Chiefs of Staff Committee to maintain strategic military communication between the inter-services and the federal government, that is to be chaired by the appointed Chairman joint chiefs as the government's principal military adviser. In 1976, Navy saw its first four-star rank admiral when Mohammad Shariff was promoted to this rank, and later becoming the first admiral to be appointed as the Chairman of Joint Chiefs Committee in 1977. In 1977, the United States reportedly transferred the two refitted  to the Pakistan Navy, which were much superior to the British frigates, followed by obtaining more destroyers from the U.S. Navy in 1982–83.

During this time, the Navy to diversify its procurement with defence deals made with China, France, and the United Kingdom but the dependence grew on China when the Navy acquired the anti-submarine warships that gave the Navy credible sea-denial capability. Induction of the Agosta-70A class gave Pakistan Navy a depth advantage over the Indian Navy, and gave the Navy an ability to conduct operations in deeper Indian Ocean at wider range.

In 1982, the Reagan administration submitted the proposal of US$3.2 billion aid for Pakistan that was aimed towards economic uplift and security assistance to the United States Congress as the Navy entered in successful negotiation of obtaining the Harpoon system, despite the strong Indian lobby opposing and objecting of this deal. In 1985, the Navy bought the Mirage 5V aircraft for the naval role and were equipped with the Exocet A39 missile that gives the capability of sea denial to the Pakistan Navy. With the induction of the missile systems, long-range and depth endurance submarines, missiles destroyers, fighter aircraft, and establishment of the Maritime Security Agency, the Pakistan Navy eventually ended the Indian Navy's control over the Indian Ocean, and the Indian Navy's confidence that it could contain the Pakistan Navy at shorelines.

Eventually, the Pakistan Navy began its wartime deployment in Middle Eastern countries through the Persian Gulf and deployed its war assets in Saudi Arabia in support of the U.S. Navy's fleet in wake of the events involving the Iran–Iraq War and tensions with Libya. In 1982, the Reagan administration approved US$3.2 billion military and economic aid to Pakistan with Pakistan acquiring eight  and  frigates from the United States Navy on a five-year lease in 1988. A depot for repairs,  followed the lease of these ships in April 1989. This was done due to the Zia administration's co-operation with the Reagan administration against the Soviet Union's invasion in Afghanistan.

Self reliance, engagement and covert operations (1990–1999)

After the Russian troops withdrawal from Afghanistan in 1989, the Bush administration imposed the arms embargo on Pakistan by uncovering the existence of the covert atomic bomb program to the United States Congress, which ultimately refrained the transfer of the maritime patrol aircraft, missile systems, and defence software on 1 October 1990. The embargo seriously impaired the Navy's operational scope and paralysed its ability to operate in the Indian Ocean, since the Navy's fleet was composed of entirely the former U.S.-built warships.

Since 1987, the Pakistan Navy had been interested in acquiring the Type 21 frigates from the United Kingdom, and the Navy turned to the Royal Navy for an immediate purchase which was approved in 1993 whose expensive refitting and technological upgrades had to carried out by Pakistan itself at their Naval Base in Karachi over the years. In 1994, the Pakistan Navy entered in lengthy, complicated, and controversial negotiation with France to acquire the long-range submarine technology by dismissing the idea of procuring nuclear-powered submarine from China due to noise issue that the Indian Navy was quiet able to track. Despite embargo, the United States Navy maintained its relations with Pakistan Navy, inviting the Pakistanis to participate in the Inspired Siren in 1994, and gave the Pakistan Navy instructions and run down on the nuclear submarine and aircraft carrier operations. In an attempt to warm the political relations with the United States, the Pakistani military joined the U.S. actions in the Somali Civil War, conducting wartime patrol in the Somali coast.

In 1994, the Navy was deployed in support of the U.S. Navy and extended its support in 1995 to participate in Operation United Shield to conclude its side of operation after evacuating personnel and equipment of the army, marines, and air force. By 1996, the Brown amendment was introduced that allowed the uplifting of the embargo on Pakistan, allowing the transfer of the maritime patrol aircraft to the Navy.

By 1997, the controversy over the technology transfer from France had tarnished the public image of the Navy with the arrest of naval chief when several cases were levelled on political and military leadership of the Navy. In 1999, the Navy saw the public disagreement with the federal government over the issue of Pakistan Army's engagement with Indian Army in Kashmir and over the rightful appointment of the Admiral Fasih Bokhari as Chairman joint chiefs. Pakistan Navy was forced to deploy its existing war assets when the Indian Navy deployed its warships near Korangi Creek Cantonment and Port of Karachi with their codename: Operation Talwar.

On 10 August 1999, a serious incident took place in Sir Creek region when the Indian Air Force shot down the Naval Aviation aircraft that resulted in deaths of 16 naval personnel, mostly officers. On 29 August 1999, another aircraft of the Navy, P3C Orion, was lost due to an accident with the loss of twenty one lives.

Over the issue of the Indian Air Force's shot down of the aircraft, the Navy filed a lawsuit against the Indian Air Force at the International Court of Justice, but the claim was later dismissed due to over-reaching of the court's mandate.

After his incident in 1999, another proposal was raised to switched the air-independent propulsion of Agosta submarine to substitute with nuclear propulsion, however the proposal was dismissed.

War on Terror in Afghanistan and operations in North-West (2001–present)

After the 9/11 terrorist attacks in the United States, the sanctions on Pakistan were eventually uplifted, allowing the Navy to procure the U.S.-built weapon systems and warships to regain its ability to operate in the Indian Ocean as it became involved in war preparations during the standoff with India in 2001–02. In 2001, the Navy took serious consideration of deploying the nuclear weapons on its submarines although none of the nuclear weapons were ever deployed in the submarines.

In 2003–04, there were several proposals made for acquiring the vintage aircraft carriers but the Navy itself had dismissed the idea since the country has not aspired to have an aircraft capability. In 2002–03, the Pakistan Navy deployment took place in the Indian Ocean, participating in the naval drills to combat terrorism from seaborne platforms, and eventually entered in defence negotiations with China for acquiring the technology to designing and building the guided missile frigates— the F-22P guided missile frigates were eventually built it in 2006–15.

Since 2004, the Navy's deployment took place in Indian Ocean, playing a crucial role in the multinational NAVCENT in Bahrain, and took the leadership of the CTF-150 and CTF-151 as well as taking active participation in the Operation Enduring Freedom in 2006–10.

Its deployment in the War on terror also included their actions in the War in Afghanistan when the Navy's special forces were deployed to take participation in the Operations: Black Thunderstorm, Rah-i-Nijat, Mehran, and the Help.

Despite its seaborne mission, the Navy had played an active role in controlling the insurgency in former tribal belt in Western Pakistan, mostly taking roles in managing logistics and intelligence gathering as well as conducting ground operations with the army in Western areas to track down the al-Qaeda operatives. From 2010 to 2011, the Navy was in a brief direct conflict with the violent TTP group and al-Qaeda, and its Naval Intelligence was able to track down the infiltrated militants within the ranks of the Navy.

In 2015, the Navy was deployed in support of the Saudi-led blockade of Yemen after accepting the request from the Saudi Arabia. As of current, the Navy continues increase its operational scope in the Indian Ocean and reportedly successfully entering in defence talks with Turkey to jointly built the MILGEM project in Pakistan in 2018–2019 while it had earlier announced to start the building the program of the nuclear submarine for its current operational capabilities in 2013.

Organization, Naval Headquarters

Principal Staff Commands and Principal Staff Officers

Leadership in the Navy is provided by the Minister of Defense, leading and controlling the direction of the department of navy from the Naval Secretariat-II at the Ministry of Defense, with the Defense Secretary who is responsible for the bureaucratic affairs of the army's department. The Constitution sets the role of the elected President of Pakistan as the civilian Commander-in-Chief of the Pakistan Armed Forces while the Prime Minister of Pakistan served as the Chief Executive of the Pakistan Armed Forces, both the people-elected civilians, the President and Prime minister, maintains a civilian control of the military.

The Chief of Naval Staff (CNS), an appointed four-star rank admiral, is a principal military adviser on the naval/maritime security affairs to the Federal government and is a senior member of the Joint Chiefs of Staff Committee (JCSC)— a military body that advises and briefs the elected civilian Prime Minister and its executive cabinet on national security affairs and operational military matters under the Chairman of the Joint Chiefs of Staff Committee.

The war functions of the Navy is controlled from the single combat headquarters, the Navy NHQ, located in Islamabad at vicinity of the Joint Staff Headquarters and the Army GHQ in Rawalpindi Cantonment in Punjab in Pakistan. The Chief of Naval Staff controls and commands the Navy at all levels of operational command, and is assisted by number of Principal Staff Officers (PSOs) (Staff Commanders) who are commissioned at the three-star rank and two-star rank admirals.The Staff Appointments marked in the light goldish yellow color are the most important seats at NHQ which play a very important administrative role for the proper functioning of the Pakistan Navy and its assests.

Due to the influence from the Royal Navy and later by the United States Navy since its earliest inception, the Pakistan Navy has a unique command structure and the navy's functionality is divided in various branches.

There are seven military staff commands in the navy that are in fact administrative, directed by the several appointed Deputy Chief of the Naval Staff (DCNS) and often assisted by the Assistant Chief of the Naval Staff (ACNS) holding the rank of commodore a one-star rank senior officer reporting directly to their respective Deputy Chief of the Naval Staff (DCNS). The Deputy Chiefs Of Naval Staff are usually holding either the two-star or three-star ranks.The each and appointed Deputy Chief of the Naval Staff head or commander of their respected branch reports directly to the Chief of the Naval Staff (CNS) at Navy NHQ in Islamabad of their respected command.

The military administration of the Navy under the Naval Chief based in the Navy NHQ includes its Principal Staff Commands and Principal Staff Officers:

Organizations and Heads of Services, Pakistan Navy
The Organizations and the Heads of Services operating in the Pakistan Navy and reporting directly to the Naval Chief are as follows:

Naval components and branches
Each branch in the navy offers specialisation and officers interested in joining the particular service have to pass aptitude tests before attending the specialised school that usually last for two to three years, in which the officer is able to attain a college degree.

Naval Commands in Field and Commanders 
Since its restructuring and reorganisation over the several years, the Pakistan Navy now operates eight operational and tactical field commands and also two major type commands, two of the important commands of aviation and submarines are reporting directly to the senior Pakistan Fleet Command. Each command is headed by a senior flag officer who usually holds a ranks of three-star rank: Vice-Admiral and two-star rank: Rear-Admiral. The appointment to the senior fleet commander known as s Commander, Pakistan Fleet leads the navy's entire fleet with a responsibility of deploying the entire combat formations of the navy.

Geographically, there are three administrative commanders, such as Commander Karachi (COMKAR), Commander Central Punjab (COMCEP), and Commander Northern (COMNOR), are administrating the bulk of naval installations, offshore establishments, and training facilities besides the seven oceanic based commands.

In 2012, the Pakistan Navy established the Naval Strategic Forces Command that has area responsibility of exercising the deployment of sea-borne nuclear weapons and is described by the military as the "custodian of the nation's nuclear second strike capability."

The peacetime commands and the Commands in the Navy allocated are given below.

Special operations forces

The Special Service Group (Navy) (SSG(N)), colloquially known as the SSGN is an elite unit that conducts unconventional warfare, combat diving, naval interdiction, and asymmetric warfare operations, established under the guidance of the United States Navy's SEALs in 1966.

The Navy Special Service Group is headquartered at PNS Iqbal in Karachi where the physical conditioning and weapon tactics training take place. The Navy Special Service Group's specialisation further includes training and mastery in the visit, board, search, and seizure methods, naval interdiction, and security operations to prevent seaborne-based terrorism.

The Navy Special Service Group is a tighter unit composed of highly qualified and selected personnel who are modelled on and inspired by the U.S. Navy SEALs training and tradition. The actual number of personnel of Navy Special Service Group is classified and their deployment are also subjected to classified information.

In 1970–71, the Navy established the Pakistan Marines to support the amphibious warfare operations and were initially influenced by the United States Marines Corps but the Marines component was decommissioned by the federal government in 1974. On 14 April 1990, the Pakistan Marines were again recommissioned in the Navy with about 2,000 personnel. The advanced training of the Marines are often takes place with the Pakistan Army at their School of Infantry and Tactics in Quetta in Balochistan.

The 1st Marines Battalion, the special operation unit, of the Pakistan Marines is specifically trained by the Pakistan Army to conduct infiltration and anti-aircraft warfare operations. The 1st Battalion is currently deployed in Sir Creek.

Military philosophy

Combat doctrine

The military doctrine and philosophy of the Pakistan Navy is primarily directed towards preventing the Indian Navy repeating the 1971 blockade of the Pakistani coasts. From 1947 until 1971, the Pakistan Navy was effectively little more than a coast guard because the Government of Pakistan did not give importance to the strategy of protecting the sea lines of communication. In 1971, the Indian Navy ultimately played a decisive role by enforcing a blockade of Chittagong and Karachi, the only maritime outlets of East Pakistan and West Pakistan respectively. The Navy was unable to break the blockade leading to Pakistan's economic and military resources being severely drained and communication was limited between the two wings of the country. Subsequently, the federal government increased the funding of the Navy.

Since 1971 the Navy tactical doctrine has included the acquisition, development, employment, and aggressive deployment of the long-range and depth reaching submarines in an effort to target and destroy its adversaries by attacking surface warships before reaching the country's ports. The mining of the Karachi's harbour is also taken as a serious consideration of preventing the enemy from launching the missile attacks in the port city of Karachi.

The routine deployment of the surface fleet as part of the Combined Task Forces provides the opportunity to the safeguard the sealines of communications.  Since 1999, the Pakistan Marines's special reconnaissance forces has been deployed in the Sir Creek region are aimed towards offshore protection against the incursions from the Indian Army's Para Commandos from the sea while taking the initiatives of deployment of the special forces groups behind the enemy lines through insertion by the HALO/HAHO airdrop or by using the midget submarines.

Responding to the development of the INS Arihant, the Pakistan Navy reportedly announced the launch of the nuclear powered submarine program to counter the submarine threat in 2012.

The Navy eventually pushed for attaining the naval-based nuclear second-strike capability in 2017 when the ISPR announced the Pakistan Navy's to have attained the sea-based second strike capability when it launched the nuclear SLCM based on the Babur cruise missile, though the range of the SLCM remains to be at the short range.

Equipment

Ships: Surface combatants

The names of the commissioned warship and noncombat vessels of the Pakistan Navy are prefixed with the capital letters "PNS"— the Pakistan Navy Ship. The naming convention of the ship are selected by the Ministry of Defense, often honouring the important people or places in the history of Pakistan, and then commissioned by the President of Pakistan.

The Surface Fleet, established in 1947, is a pivotal component of the Navy with crucial role in maintaining the military balance with the Indian Navy in the Indian Ocean, taking part in multinational task forces to prevent seaborne terrorism and piracy.

The Navy currently operates approximately 100 vessels including ones used by the Maritime Security Agency (MSA) and Pakistan Marines. In the current inventory, the Navy has a combination of British, American, Chinese, and locally produced ships including the American , British-designed , and locally-built  (built with Chinese assistance). Decommissioning of the ageing  destroyer has commenced due to construction of the additional missile guidance  in Pakistan by 2021, and the acquisition of the Jiangkai II-class frigates from China that started in 2017.

The Tariq class are the guided missile destroyers that are in the service with the 25th Destroyer Squadron while the F-22P Zulfiquar class are the guided missile frigate attached with the 18th Destroyer Squadron with a complement of the American-transferred  (now PNS Alamgir) in 2011.

In 1992, the French Navy transferred its  and helped designed the s in Pakistan as a local production that increased the Pakistan Navy's operational scope and its overall capabilities.

In 2011, the Navy commissioned the Azmat-class corvette based on the Chinese design of Type 037II Houjian missile boat with the lead boat being designed in China while three remaining were built in Pakistan through the technology transfer agreement– these missile boats are commissioned into the 10th Patrol Squadron. In addition, the 10th Patrol Squadron has commissioned the two Jurrat-class missile boats based on the German-designed and two missile boat based on the from the Turkish design, MRTP. The Larkana-class gunboats are locally produced at the KSEW Ltd. in Karachi that is in the current service with the Pakistan Navy, forming the Fast Patrol Craft Squadron.

In addition to the Navy's operations of warships, the Navy operates twenty-two coast guard ships intended for the [Maritime Security Agency–most are imported from China while others are locally build to guard the coastal shoreline of Pakistan's seaborne borders from the illegal activities, followed by the ten of the locally designed and built patrol boats for the Coast Guards for the safety and policing of the beaches in the country.

In 2017, the Pakistan Navy entered in discussion with the Turkish Navy to acquire four of the MILGEM-class warship, and eventually signing a major defence deal based on a technology transfer with Turkey on 5 July 2018, which was described as "the largest defense export of Turkey in one agreement."

The Pakistan Navy Fleet Tanker Project (PNFT), of which STM, one of Turkey's leading companies in the defence industry, is the prime contractor, joined the Pakistan Navy in 2018.

On 1 June 2018, Pakistan Navy ordered four Type 054As. The ships are expected to enter service by 2021.

The steel-cutting ceremony for the second Type 054A frigate for the Pakistan Navy (PN) was held in China on 19 December 2018, marking the beginning of construction of the vessel at the Hudong-Zhonghua shipyard in Shanghai, China.

On 1 November 2019, China's Hudong-Zhonghua Shipbuilding held a steel cutting ceremony for the Pakistan Navy's third and fourth Type 054A frigates.

Pakistan Navy outgoing Chief of Naval Staff (CNS) Admiral Zafar Mahmood Abbasi said Navy will add more than 50 vessels, including 20 major ships, to its fleet as part of an ambitious modernisation plan to improve its capabilities. 

According to outgoing Chief of Naval Staff (CNS) statement, experts suggest Navy would induct Six Chinese Type 054A frigate, four Jinnah class frigate under the transfer of Technology agreement from Turkey.

Lastly, outgoing Chief of Naval Staff (CNS) Admiral Zafar Mahmood Abbasi revealed contract for Six more heavy tonnage warships has been signed. Experts believe these ships would be based on Chinese destroyers.

In addition, Navy would operate four modified Ada class corvette's from Turkey, two multi-purpose Yarmook class corvettes built by Dutch shipbuilder Damen Shipyards and twenty fast attack missile boats.

Submarines

Established in 1964, the Submarine Command is a major component of the Navy whose primary mission is to conduct clandestine military reconnaissance for intelligence and carry out precision strikes on enemy positions from underwater during war.

There are eight submarines in active service including the  submarines, based on the Agosta-70A class, and three Italian–designed and locally–built midget  (designated as X-Craft) submarines. The submarines are powered with diesel-electric and air-independent propulsion.

The Hashmat-class submarines are equipped with an air-independent propulsion system giving a capability of deeper dives and the ability to submerge for a longer period of time without detection. They are armed with Exocet and Babur-III missiles, which can be launched from underwater. Two of the three Agosta-90B class are currently undergoing refitting and modernisation by the Turkish firm, STM, and are expected to return to full active duty in 2020–21.

In 2014, Pakistan Navy entered in defence discussions with the People's Liberation Army Navy for the procurement of the Yuan-class AIP powered submarines, and eventually succeeded when the technology transfer agreement was signed between two nations in April 2015. This national submarine program is known as  features air-independent propulsion is being constructed as a joint-venture with China with the expectation of being commissioned between 2023 and 2028.

In April 2014, the Navy announced that submarine operations would move from Naval Base Karachi to the new Jinnah Naval Base in Ormara.

Submarine training takes place at PNS Abdoze in Karachi. In May 2008, the Navy established the Fleet Acoustic Research and Classification Centre to validate submarine safety standards and to act as an underwater listening post to track unauthorised submarines.

Auxiliaries, mine countermeasures, and amphibious warfare

The Navy has six replenishment oil tankers, three minehunters, and four Griffon 2000TD hovercraft for the amphibious warfare. The Landing Craft Mechanized (LCM) are the important and center pieces for the amphibious operations undertaken by the Marines Corps and expeditionary actions by the Army as the two of the LCMs are commissioned by the Navy after being handed over by the KSEW Ltd. in 2016.

In 1995, Poolster-class PNS Moawin was subjected to a serious fire accident that claimed valuable life during the refitting of the vessel in Karachi. The Navy also operates two coastal tankers that were indigenously designed and locally built at the Karachi Shipyard— PNS Gwadar and PNS Kalmat— commissioned in 1984 and in 1992. In 2011, the Navy commissioned two more small tankers/utility ships (STUS) —PNS Madadgar and PNS Rasadgar —to support the logistics and marine operations in the open sea.

Together with the Munsif-class minehunters and the replenishment oil tankers, these classes of ships are commissioned and complemented in the 9th Auxiliary Squadron. In 2018, the Pakistan Navy commissioned another  which was locally engineered and constructed from the crucial design guidance from Turkey– the fleet tanker is noted for being the largest warship ever built in Pakistan.

In 2011, the Pakistan Navy established the 21st Auxiliary Squadron to further support its fleet's logistics operations to fulfill the requirements of hydrological survey in the ocean, and the dredging operations in the area of responsibility that includes the training requirements for the Pakistan Navy's personnel at the deeper ocean which is conducted by a dedicated Sail Training Vessel.

Aircraft

The Aircraft in the Pakistan Navy provides the logistical support to the navy's readiness at all level of commands and serves as the supply platform, through helicopters, to conduct the search and rescue, special operations, anti-submarine warfare (ASW), and the anti-surface warfare (ASuW). Unlike the Indian Navy, the Pakistan Navy does not have the rapid aircraft carrier based strike capability but relies its aerial strike operations from clear and traditionally long landing platform built at the Mehran Naval Air Station in Karachi.
After realising the failure to protect the harbour from the attacks of the Indian Navy in 1971, the Navy took the research on using the aircraft on sea in an attempt to lessen the dependence on the Pakistan Air Force, which already covers the airspace of Pakistan, and established the naval aviation branch, the Naval Air Arm, in 1974.

The Navy's principal aerial fighting branch is known as the Naval Air Arm whose initial pilots' training took place at the Air Force Academy in Risalpur.

The Navy operates the Fokker F27 Friendship, Breguet Atlantique, Lockheed P-3 Orion, ATR 72, and Hawker 800 as their fixed-wing aircraft inventory. The rotary-wing aircraft in the naval air arm includes the Harbin Z-9 and the Westland Sea King while the Lynx helicopters have now been removed from active service due to maintenance issues, and a tender has been issued for their removal. In addition, there are numbers of aircraft active in the Maritime Security Agency (MSA).

Weapon system and air defence

Current weapon systems in the Pakistan Navy is entirely composed and focused towards missiles, serving as both weapons or a defence from a threat.

In 1971 with the Indian Navy's introduction of anti-ship missiles, Navy had the strong emphasis on classically using the artillery and ammunition focusing towards the vintage tactics witnessed in the previous naval wars fought in the World War II.

The Navy's primary air defence included the usage of the LY-80, FM-90, FIM-92 Stinger, RBS 70, Feinu-6, Anza and the Mistral system.

The primary and standard rifle issued for the Navy is the POF G3P4, which is standard issue by the Ministry of Defense, and is based on the German design of the Heckler and Koch G3 rifle.

The Navy's air defence system are entrusted with the Pakistan Marines who receives their weapons training at the School of Infantry and Tactics in Quetta with the Pakistan Army soldiers.

In 2016, the Navy inducted the Harbah cruise missile, based on the Babur design, that was test fired from the PNS Himmat– the  missile boat. The Navy operates the Zarb cruise missile that was first test fired on 10 April 2016.

The cruise missiles system in the Navy, the Harbah, Zarb, and even Babur–III, are the variants and derivatives of the improved engineered version of the first cruise missile that entered in the service of the Pakistan Army— the Babur cruise missile system in 2003.
 FN-16, the man-portable air-defense systems, tested on 25 December 2010 by Pakistan Marines with a range of 6 km and altitude ~ 3.5 km.
 Mistral shoulder-fired surface-to-air missile, test fired on 25 December 2010 by Pakistan Marines.

The military uniform in the Pakistan Navy includes the full white-worn service uniform as seen in the footage, and is worn on regular basis by the senior ranking star officers in the Navy. In the past times of 1947–2012, the Navy's uniform had closely followed the uniforms issued in the British Royal Navy with star officers often wearing the full white dress while the junior officers to enlisted members only wearing dressed-up blue working uniforms as their authorised working uniform in the vessels.

In 2014, the Navy working uniform pattern for all officials have been changed in favour of adopting the authorised digital camouflage pattern uniform which incorporates sparse black and medium grey shapes on a light grey background.

The Navy Special Service Group follows the Army Special Service Group's authorised uniform and wears the U.S. Woodland (M81) uniform while the Pakistan Marines have their own woodland pattern featuring light brown, olive green and blue shapes on a tan or light olive background.

Air defence systems

Naval Anti-ship Missiles

Bases and facilities

From 1947 to 1991, the entire naval infrastructure and bases of the Pakistan Navy were primarily based in Karachi with the exception of the Navy NHQ in Islamabad. In the 1950s, it was the crucial help from the United States Navy that the Karachi Naval Dockyard was built and constructed for wartime operations. Besides the Naval Base Karachi, the PNS Dhaka in East Pakistan was the only naval base for the Pakistan Navy, dedicated for coastal operations only

After the Indian Navy's missile attacks in Karachi in 1971, the Navy concentrated on building and moving its operational assets in Balochistan, Punjab, and the Khyber-Pakhtunkhwa.

These naval bases are operationalised for various purposes including the logistics and maintenance support, armoury and ammunition support, air stations, military hospitals, SEALs teams, coastal and missile defences, missile boats and submarine bases, forward operating bases etc. The PNS Zafar serves as the major logistics naval base for the Pakistani military's operational capability in the western and northern Pakistan, followed by the naval forward operating base constructed at the vicinity of the Naval War College in Lahore.

The primary naval air station, where the Mirage 5 are stationed, is the Naval Air Station Mehran (PNS Mehran), followed by the establishment of the naval air stations in Makran, Ormara, Turbat and the Manora Island. In 2017, the PNS Siddiq was commissioned to support the aerial missions for the Navy's Naval Aviation reconnaissance group to guard the safety of the CPEC.

The PNS Hameed, commissioned in 2017, is an ELF and a VLF facility near the Karachi coast, while the Karachi-based PNS Iqbal and the PNS Qasim serves for the operational activities dedicated for the Navy Special Service Group and the Marines Corps. The Jinnah Naval Base and the Kalmat Naval Base are dedicated towards maintaining and harbouring the country's strategic assets such as the nuclear-capable submarines.

Besides deployment within Pakistan, the Pakistan Navy, along with the inter-services branches, are permanently based in different parts in the Saudi Arabia and the United Arab Emirates.

Medical care
The Navy operates four hospitals:
 PNS Shifa Hospital, Karachi (600 beds)
 PNS Hafeez Hospital, Islamabad (197 beds)
 PNS Rahat Hospital, Karachi (200 beds)
 PNS Darmaan Jah Hospital, Ormara (100 beds)

Personnel

Commissioned officers

From its commencement in August 1947, the Pakistan Navy had traditionally followed the ranks and insignia of the Royal Navy but disbanded in favour of adopting the officer ranks system of the United States Navy as early as the 1950s.

Unlike the army or air force where there are several paths to become the officers, there is only one way of becoming the naval officer by must attending the Pakistan Naval Academy—after passing out the boot camp in Manora Island— for one-and-half year for them to be able to passed out from the academy.

The passed out cadets gain commission in the Navy as midshipman, taking their first assignment in an open-sea ship that gives them the experience of life at sea while being trained in different careers on board.  The training of the passed out midshipman usually lasts till six months before rotating back to the naval academy to be promoted as the Sub-Lieutenants. Their college education is provided by the Navy at the Naval Engineering College in Karachi for three years that led them to earn the bachelor's degree in their choice of career.

The rank hierarchy in Navy is divided in three categories: junior officers, senior officers, and star officers— the Junior officers are those in pay grade scale of OF-1 to OF-3 while the senior officers are in scale of OF-4 to OF-5 and the star officers are in the pay grade scale from OF-6 to above OF-9.

Besides the military officers, the Department of Navy also offers employments to civilians in financial management, accountancy, medical services, computing, and administration, and has currently employed ~2,000 civilians that met the Navy's quota in 2018.

According to the various admissions and estimations provided by the International Institute for Strategic Studies, the Pakistan Navy's combined strength of the standing navy is ~54,100 personnel including the active duty personnel, Navy Reserves, Marines Corps, the Pakistan Maritime Security Agency (PMSA), and the personnel from the naval-side of the Coast Guards– the branch within the Pakistan Army.

Enlisted personnel

The recruitment and the enlistment in the navy is nationwide and the recruitment in the Navy is carried out by the release of the employment tender in the print newspapers and televised commercials twice a year– first group attending the boot camp in May and the second being directed on November. The Directorate of Recruitment that is located in the Navy NHQ in Islamabad controls the recruiting offices and centers in all over the country— the recruiting offices are located in Punjab, Khyber-Pakhtunkhwa, Sindh, and Balochistan. Before 1966, almost all the enlisted personnel and officers had to be sent to attend the military academies in the United Kingdom to be educated and to be trained in technical branches for the Pakistan Navy.

After passing out from the nine-month long boot camp, the enlisted personnel are directed for subsequent job training at the PNS Karsaz in Karachi on the matters of technical subjects and assigned for different branches in the Navy.

Promotion in the Navy from the enlistment to officers ranks are much quicker than the army or the air force, as the Department of Navy offers financial aid to those enlisted personnel successful in their profession to attend the colleges and universities. Most of the enlisted personnel rarely stays in their enlisted ranks at the time of their retirement as most retires at junior officer ranks once reaching their retirement age of 62

Their technical experiences in their fields is consolidated into the professional training that forms their basis to attend the respective university for them to earn the four-year college degree.

The noncommissioned officers (or enlists) wear respective anchors color patches or badges chevrons on their shoulders. Retirement age for the enlisted personnel varies and depends on the enlisted ranks that they have attained during their services.

Recruitment and training

After the Navy was established in August 1947, the Navy had to send its officers and enlisted personnel to be trained at the Britannia Royal Naval College in the United Kingdom whose training and education by the British Royal Navy was crucial at all levels of cadet's learning and schooling. During its earliest time in 1947, the Department of Navy had only 3,800 personnel (200 officers, 3,000 Enlists, and 500 civilian employees) as the Navy faced the same problems as its Department of Army as the most technical enlisted personnel and skilled executive officers were Punjabi Muslims while others had Urdu-speaking background (i.e. Indian immigrants as naturalised citizens of Pakistan).

After 1971, the Bhutto administration introduced the quota system to give fair chance to the residents of Khyber-Pakhtunkhwa and Balochistan to enlist in the military. In 2012, Sanhia Karim became the first Balochi woman to be commissioned into the navy, she joined in a squad consisting of fifty-three female officers and seventy-two enlists from Balochistan, Pakistan. In 2012, the Navy pushed its personnel strength to Balochistan after sending a large formation of Baloch university students to Navy Engineering Colleges and War College as well as staff schools to complete their officer training requirements. The Navy established three additional facilities in Balochistan to supervise the training to its personnel.

Recruitment in the Navy remains to be challenge for the naval recruiters to enlists citizens and their selfless commitment to the military from the urbanised metropolitan cities where the preference of college education (especially attending post-graduate schooling in the United States and the English-speaking countries) is much higher and strongly desirable. Furthermore, the medical standards and education levels required by the Department of Navy to be able to perform technical jobs also poses significant challenges as the Navy requiring the significant percentage marks once the matriculation examinations are concluded.

The Navy has only one boot camp, the PNS Himalaya in Manora Island, where the basic military training takes place. The basic military training at the PNS Himalaya goes for nine-months where instructions on military life is given while the physical conditioning is strongly emphasised. Once completing the boot camp, the enlisted personnel are sent to attend the Pakistan Naval Academy where their training lasts for year and half before they are able to passed out from the Naval Academy. Once passing out, the commissioned junior officers must spend six-month deployment in Indian Ocean before being selected to attend the professional schools, such as the Naval Engineering College in Karachi, to move towards attaining the bachelor's degree in a period of four-years.

As the estimates made in 2003 and 2009, the Navy had approximately ~30,200 active duty personnel. In 2014, the estimates established the Navy's manpower strength at 30,700 active duty personnel. but its combined manpower strength is increased and approximated at ~40,500 personnel based on recent estimates in 2018.

Education and training

Schooling, teaching, and institutions

The Pakistan Navy offers the wide range of lucrative careers to the high school graduates in the technical fields by issuing specialised diplomas and certifications at the PNS Karsaz and the PNS Bahadur, which consists of the schools of operations, underwater, surface weapons, communications, and the naval police. Instructions and technical education on technical fields and the engineering are primarily taught at the Pakistan Navy Engineering College that is open for both military and public admission, and offers college degree programs at undergraduate and post-graduate level.

When the Navy was established in 1947, there was no technical schools for the Navy to look after the ship maintenance and power machinery that led to the establishment of the Pakistan Naval Polytechnic Institute (PNPI) in 1951 and the Navy Engineering College in 1962 whose admissions are open to public besides the military personnel. From 1947 to 1967, the Navy had to rely on the education and training provided by the Royal Navy at all levels of schooling, and had to send most of its officers and enlisted men to be trained at the Britannia Royal Naval College at the Dartmouth and the Royal Naval College in Greenwhich who were mostly trained in communication and navigation. Training on the operations of warships and education on the military staffing was crucial for the Pakistan Navy in the 1960s under the United States-sponsored International Military Education and Training (IMET) arranged for Pakistan under the Security Assistance Program (SAP) as the U.S. Navy's officers served in the faculty of the engineering and technical schools of the Navy.

In 1966, the Pakistan Naval Academy was established under the guidance of the United States Navy, and is a premier institution of higher learning whose alumni included the Commanders of the Royal Qatari Navy, Royal Saudi Navy, and the Sri Lanka Navy while other nations naval cadets have also attended the naval academy.

In 1968, the Naval War College was established in Lahore, whose curriculum is very similar to the Naval War College in the United States, is a primary military staff college which offers critical thinking techniques and developing ideas for naval warfare to the officers in the army and the air force. In 1970, the School of Logistics and Management was established that conducts research on military logistics and management in imparting naval warfare techniques to the military officers serving in the army, air force, and marines departments of the Pakistani military.

After the 1971 war with India, the Navy established several schools on strategy, naval warfare, and weapons tactics by commissioning the PNS Bahadur in 1981 as the navy established schools are listed below:

Source: Pakistan Navy (Official Website)

Established in 1971, the National Defense University (NDU) in Islamabad is the most senior and premier institute of higher learning that provides the advance critical thinking level and research-based strategy level education to the senior military officers in the Pakistani military. The NDU is a significant institution of higher learning in understanding the institutional norms of military tutelage in Pakistan because it constitutes the "highest learning platform where the military leadership comes together for common instruction", according to thesis written by Pakistani author Aqil Shah. Without securing their graduation from their master's program at the NDU, no officer in the Pakistani military can be promoted as general in the army or air force, or admiral in the navy or marines as it is a prerequisite for their promotion to become a senior member at the Joint Chiefs of Staff Committee.

Additionally, the platform provided at the NDU represents a radical shift from the emphasis on operational and staff functions and the level of ranks are imposed as qualification to attend the master's program at the NDU, usually brigadiers, air commodores, and commodores, are invited to given admission in broad range of strategic, political, social, and economic factors as these factors affect the country's national security. In this sense, the NDU becomes the critical thinking institution as its constitutes active-duty senior military officers corps' baptism into a shared ideological framework about the military's appropriate role, status, and behaviour in relation to state and society, and shared values affect how these officers perceive and respond to civilian governmental decisions, policies, and political crises. Admission to the NDU is not restricted to military officials, but civilians can also attend and graduate, allowing them to explore the broader aspects of national security. 

Established in 1991, the National University of Sciences and Technology (NUST) has now absorbed and amalgamated the existing naval engineering college, and is a counterpart institution in science and technology to that of the NDU in Islamabad. Besides the strategic and military education, the Navy leads the scientific programs at the Naval Observatory for producing timing and navigation while it leads the research on hydrography by conducting the hydrographic survey for the Pakistani military through the PNS Behr Paima, and provides support to the oceanographic program led by the civilians National Institute of Oceanography (NIO).

Naval jack

From 1947 to 1956, the Pakistan Navy had stuck with the Ensign of the Royal Indian Navy that featured the British Queen's colors and the white flag. The Navy continued the tradition that it inherited from the Royal Indian Navy and British culture that was common with the Royal Navy until the American military advisers was attached the guide the Navy on military arts and science under the Military Advisory Assistance Group by the Eisenhower administration in 1956.

Since then, the Navy's tradition and culture is commonly and uniquenly influenced from the United States Navy.

After the promulgation of the Constitution in 1956, the Navy gained its independence from the British Royal patronage and became the federal institution of the armed forces commissioned by the elected President of Pakistan. The prefix Royal was permanently removed from the Navy as well as disbanding the British monarch culture and tradition in the Navy.

The naval jack and the ensign flag of the Navy immediately replaced the English Queen's colors and the white ensign entirely, instead the dark blue color with the anchor crest of the Navy was adopted while the blue anchor was added in the side of the corner white colored section on the national flag of Pakistan. Since then, the naval jack has always flown in the warships of the Pakistan Navy while the naval ensign of the Navy is commonly used by the Pakistan Marines as their primary war flag.

Civil society and business activities

The Pakistan Navy has played an integral part in the civil society of Pakistan, almost since its inception.  In 1996, General Jehangir Karamat described Pakistan armed forces' relations with the society:

In times of national calamities and emergencies, the Pakistan Navy has been deployed in relief operations and nation building programs in the country. In 2004, a tactical task force under then-Commodore Asif Sandila coordinated the peacetime relief operations in Maldives, Sri Lanka, Indonesia, and Bangladesh when the underwater earthquake caused a tsunami and struck the South Asian nations. In 2005, the Navy deployed the PNS Badr (D-184) to help assists the relief efforts for the earthquake that struck the northern part of the country in October 2005.

In 2010, the Navy coordinated one of its largest relief operations during the nationwide flash floods, with Navy divers rescuing and evacuating more than 352,291 people in August 2010. In addition, the Navy and Marines personnel provided 43,850 kg of food and relief goods to flood victims; 5,700 kg of ready-to-cook food, 1,000 kg of dates and 5,000 kg of food has been dispatched to Sukkur., under the program PN Model Village, the Navy's civil engineering corps built the model houses in the affected areas for the internally displaced person (IDPs).

Corporate and business activities

The Pakistan Navy has the wider commercial and financial interests in the country, and is a forerunner of the Bahria Foundation (lit. Naval Foundation). From 1996 to 2000, the Navy was a major sponsor of the Bahria Town– the real estate enterprise– and reportedly received market shares for the use of its name in commercial building projects. In 2002, the Navy filed a civil lawsuit to refrain the Bahria Town using its name for profiteering– the lawsuit was eventually settled in civil court in favour of Navy in 2018.

For external billets appointment, the federal government takes the senior leadership of the Navy as secondment to manage the federal institutions such as the Karachi Port Trust, Port of Karachi, and the Port of Gwadar.

Awards and honours

Wartime Gallantry Awards

Nishan-e-Haider

In military awards hierarchy, the Nishan-e-Haidar (lit.  Order of Lion; Urdu: نشان حیدر; its abbreviation is noted as NH) is the highest and the most prestigious honour awarded posthumously for bravery and actions of valor in event of war. Established in March 1956 by the Constitution, this award is an equivalent to the American Medal of Honor, British Victoria Cross (VC), Russian Order of St. Andrew, or the French Legion of Honour.

In a sharp contrast to the American Medal of Honor, the Nishan-e-Haider (NH) has only conferred to the ones who have martyred and proved their distinguished valor of actions in an event of conflict or war— therefore the Nishan-e-Haider has never been conferred to the living military officers who are mostly conferred with the Hilal-e-Jurat or Sitara-e-Jurat.}

Recommendations in forms of letters are received and then accepted by the federal government which recognises the martyred services of the one individual that distinguished by the his acts of valor during the events of the war.

The honour is a namesake of Ali— the fourth caliph, the cousin, and the son-in-law of Muhammad, the last prophet of Islam— and the recipients receiving this honorary title as a sign of respect: Shaheed meaning martyr.

From 1947 till 2019, there has been ten Pakistani military officers and enlisted personnel who have achieved this feat/or have honoured with this prestigious medal— out of which, nine recipients have came from the Pakistan Army while there is only one recipients from the Pakistan Air Force, that are bestowed with this prestigious medal.

Almost all the recipients were martyred during their engagement in wars with India in 1965, 1971, and in 1999, and honoured with this prestigious award by the President of Pakistan based on the accepted recommendations.

Since the commencement of the Navy on August 1947, there has been no single naval officer or/ either a navy's enlisted member in the Pakistani military that has been honoured or bestowed with this prestigious medal— a recommendation was sent to honour one officer for his actions in the War on Terror in Afghanistan and the Western Pakistan but the recommendation was rejected by the President of Pakistan in 2011.

See also
 Pakistan Coast Guards
 Pakistan Marines
 Pakistan Naval Academy
 Pakistan Naval Air Arm
 Special Service Group (Navy)

Notes

References
Citations

Internet

External links
 

 

1947 establishments in Pakistan
Military units and formations established in 1947